Juvenilia is a term applied to literary or artistic works produced by an author during his or her youth.

Juvenilia may also refer to:

 Juvenilia (EP), a 1995 EP by Liz Phair
 Juvenilia (The Verlaines album), an album by The Verlaines
 Juvenilia (play), a play by Wendy MacLeod
 Juvenilia (film), a 1943 Argentine film
 "Juvenilia" (Frasier), an episode of the TV series Frasier
 Juvenilia (book), a collection of poems written by James Henry Leigh Hunt